Tot Watchers is a 1958 American one-reel animated Tom and Jerry short produced and directed by William Hanna and Joseph Barbera with music by Scott Bradley. The short was released by Metro-Goldwyn-Mayer on August 1, 1958. It is the 114th and last Tom and Jerry theatrical cartoon produced or directed by both Hanna and Barbera, and the last cartoon short of the series until Gene Deitch's Switchin' Kitten in 1961. Barbera would return to direct one final Tom and Jerry theatrical short, The Karate Guard, in 2005.

This is confirmed as the last appearance of Joan. This also marks the final appearances of Jeannie and the baby, as Jeannie would not be replicated in the newer entrees due to modern sensibilities regarding child neglect as a very serious matter.

Additionally, the soundtrack was officially released on Tom and Jerry & Tex Avery Too! album in the final track on the second disc.

Plot
Babysitter Jeannie (voiced by Julie Bennett) is instructed to look after the baby while his mother (also voiced by Julie Bennett) goes out. However, Jeannie begins talking on the telephone with someone, ignoring the baby and its carriage. In the midst of Tom and Jerry's usual fighting, they see the baby crawling out of its pram. Any attempt to return the baby to where it came from simply results in the baby escaping from the pram again. During one escape, the baby crawls into Spike's dog house. Tom accidentally grabs Spike instead of the baby, and is promptly pummeled. This time, Tom angrily brings the baby back to Jeannie herself, who hits Tom over the head with a broom, thinking that Tom has taken the baby away from her. Realizing that the baby is no longer worth the trouble, Tom does nothing the next time that it crawls from its pram. However, he and Jerry are forced to react after the baby crawls down to the street and into a 100-story mixed-use skyscraper construction site. The baby crawls from one steel beam to another while the two look on. Jerry manages to catch up, and saves the baby from crawling off a wooden plank lying on the 50th floor by grabbing his diaper. The diaper comes loose, and the baby falls, but he is then caught by Tom. Tom attempts to put the baby's diaper back on, but in the impending confusion, ends up putting the diaper on himself while the baby crawls off, nonchalantly. Tom and Jerry catch up with the baby, only to lose it again. Fearing that it has crawled into a cement mixer on the 30th floor, the two dive straight in, only to find that the baby never entered the mixer but is instead playing with a hammer. Later on, Jeannie is in a panic and tells a police officer that she lost the baby she was babysitting. Tom and Jerry would arrive tired with the baby. Jeannie grabs the baby while the two try to escape, but the police officer (voiced by Bill Thompson) arrests Tom and Jerry, assuming that they were "baby nappers". In the police car, Tom and Jerry explain what really happened, but the police officer doesn't believe them. Just then, to their surprise, the baby crawls past the police car and away into the distance (apparently having been neglected by Jeannie once again), making the police officer realize in shock that Tom and Jerry were telling the truth.

Production
Tot Watchers was produced by MGM Cartoons. After the departure of producer Fred Quimby from the Tom and Jerry series in 1955, directors William Hanna and Joseph Barbera took the added responsibility of producing the series themselves. According to animation historian Michael Barrier, it was during the post-Quimby period that the effects of the series' lower budget on its animation quality became more obvious, stating that "there was no hiding corner cutting behind a curtain of stylization". Scott Bradley's score for Tot Watchers was recorded on June 6, 1957.

Reception
Writer and historian Michael Samerdyke stated that Tot Watchers, though it will "never be considered one of the best of the series, ... is an entertaining cartoon and points the way to how the series would develop in the Sixties."

Home media
"Tom and Jerry Spotlight Collection, Vol. 2" (2005)
"Tom and Jerry's Greatest Chases, Vol. 5" (2010)

References

External links

American comedy short films
1950s American animated films
1958 comedy films
1958 animated films
1958 short films
1950s animated short films
CinemaScope films
Films about babies
Films scored by Scott Bradley
Metro-Goldwyn-Mayer animated short films
Metro-Goldwyn-Mayer short films
Short films directed by Joseph Barbera
Short films directed by William Hanna
Tom and Jerry short films
Metro-Goldwyn-Mayer cartoon studio short films
1950s English-language films
American animated short films
Animated films about cats
Animated films about mice